Pallada (Russian: Паллада) was the last of the four  armored cruisers built for the Imperial Russian Navy in the first decade of the 20th century. She was assigned to the Baltic Fleet during World War I where she captured codebooks from the German cruiser  that had run aground during the first month of the war. The ship was torpedoed by a German submarine in October 1914 and exploded; none of the crew survived. Pallada was the first warship lost by the Russians during the war.

Design and description
The ship had a crew of 568 officers and men. Pallada was named in honour of the earlier Russian cruiser captured by the Japanese during the Russo-Japanese War. Both ships were named for the Greek goddess, Pallas Athena.

Steam for the engines was provided by 26 Belleville boilers.

Palladas main armament consisted of two  45-calibre guns in single turrets fore and aft. Her eight  gun were mounted in casemates on the sides of the ship's hull. Anti-torpedo boat defense was provided by 20  50-calibre guns; eight of these were mounted in casemates on the side of the hull and in the superstructure. The remaining guns were located above the six-inch gun casemates in pivot mounts with gun shields. Pallada also mounted four  Hotchkiss guns. The ship also had two submerged  torpedo tubes, one mounted on each broadside.

The ship used Krupp armour throughout.

Service
Pallada was built by the Admiralty Shipyard in Saint Petersburg. Construction began on 24 June 1905, although she was not formally laid down until August, and the ship was launched on 10 November 1906. Pallada was completed in February 1911. She spent her entire career with the Baltic Fleet.

On 26 August 1914, during the first month of World War I, the German light cruiser Magdeburg ran aground near the island of Odensholm in the Gulf of Finland. Her escort, the V25-class torpedo boat SMS V-26, failed to pull her off and rescued part of the crew before Pallada and the protected cruiser  appeared and opened fire. The Germans blew up the front part of the ship, but failed to demolish the rest of the ship. They failed to destroy their naval codebooks, which were discovered by the Russians. A copy was later given to the British where it proved enormously helpful to Room 40 in reading German wireless traffic for much of the war. Together with the armoured cruiser , Pallada unsuccessfully searched for German ships between Bornholm and Danzig on the night of 27 August. Less than two months later, on 11 October, Pallada was torpedoed by the German submarine  and blew up with the loss of all hands, the first Russian warship sunk during the war.

Wreck
On 6 October 2012 the Finnish newspaper Helsingin Sanomat reported that the wreck of Pallada had been discovered by a diver group outside Hanko near the coast of Finland in 2000, but the group had waited until 2012 before publishing their find.

Although the wreck was severely damaged during the sinking and is now covered in silt, a number of details such as a large wooden emblem of the Russian double-headed eagle are still intact. One of the eight-inch turrets is resting on the seafloor next to the bow section.

On 6 September 2013, Helsingin Sanomat reported that the previously largely untouched wreck of Pallada had been looted.

Notes

Footnotes

References

External links
 World War I Naval Operations in the Baltic theater (includes account of Pallada's sinking)

Bayan-class cruisers
Ships built at Admiralty Shipyard
1906 ships
World War I cruisers of Russia
Ships sunk by German submarines in World War I
World War I shipwrecks in the Baltic Sea
Maritime incidents in October 1914
Shipwrecks in the Gulf of Finland
Ships lost with all hands
Naval magazine explosions